Santa Isabel is a municipality in north-central Goiás state, Brazil.

Location
It is 21 kilometers from Ceres, the nearest regional center.  Santa Isabel has municipal boundaries with Rubiataba, Itapaci, Nova Glória, Rialma, and Carmo do Rio Verde.  Access from Goiânia is made by GO-080 / Nerópolis / São Francisco de Goiás / BR-153 / Jaraguá / Rianápolis / Rialma / GO-480.  See Seplan

Politics and Demographics
The mayor was Laurismar Batista Borges (January 2005) and there were 9 city council members.  The number of eligible voters was 2,867 (December/2007).

The population density was 4.32 inhabitants/km2 (2007) with 1,328 (2007)  urban inhabitants and 2,157 rural inhabitants.  The population has decreased about 400 people since 1991.

The Economy
The economy is based on modest agriculture, cattle raising, services, public administration, and small transformation industries.  There were only 130 automobiles.  There were 535 farms in 2006, with 75% of the land in pasture.  The cattle herd had 74,000 head while the main crops were rice, sugarcane, beans, manioc, corn (800 hectares), and soybeans.

Health and Education
There were 5 schools.  The adult literacy rate was 82.5% (2000) (the national average was 86.4%) There were no hospitals.  The infant mortality rate was 26.34 (2000) (the national average was 33.0)

Human Development Index:  0.720
State ranking:  174 (out of 242 municipalities)
National ranking:  2,617 (out of 5,507 municipalities)

For the complete list see frigoletto.com.br

See also
List of municipalities in Goiás
Microregions of Goiás

References

Frigoletto
 Sepin

Municipalities in Goiás